Osmoxylon corneri is a species of plant in the family Araliaceae. It is endemic to Papua New Guinea.

References

Flora of Papua New Guinea
corneri
Vulnerable plants
Taxonomy articles created by Polbot